Zikhron Ya'akov (lit. It is located at the southern end of the Carmel mountain range overlooking the Mediterranean Sea, near the coastal highway (Highway 2). It was one of the first Jewish settlements of Halutzim in the country, founded in 1882 by Baron Edmond James de Rothschild and named in honor of his father, James Mayer de Rothschild ("James" being derived from the Hebrew name Ya'akov, Jacob).

History
Zikhron Ya'akov was founded in December 1882 when 100 Jewish pioneers from Romania, members of the Hibbat Zion movement, purchased two plots of land 5 km apart: 6000 dunam in Zammarin and 500 dunam in Tantura. The land was acquired for 46000 francs from Frances Germain, a French citizen, probably of Christian Arab origin. Deeming the name of the place to derive from "Samaria", for a number of years the place was called Shomron in the Hebrew and Yiddish press. The families came from Moineşti in Moldavia and a central merit in organising the move belongs to Moses Gaster, scholar and early Zionist. 

The difficulty of working the rocky soil and an outbreak of malaria led many of the settlers to leave before the year was up.

In 1883, Baron Edmond James de Rothschild became the patron of the settlement and drew up plans for its residential layout and agricultural economy. Zikhron was one of the first Jewish agricultural colonies to come under the wing of the Baron (along with Rishon LeZion and Rosh Pinna), who renamed it in memory of his father, James (Ya'akov) Mayer de Rothschild.

To accomplish his first objective, Baron de Rothschild brought in planners who designed and allotted housing lots along the main road for the use of settlement farmers. Each lot included a house facing the street, a long interior courtyard and a rear building for storing agricultural implements. The French-inspired architecture included tiled roofs and painted wooden windows. Each farmer was given a salary and placed under the direction of Elijah Shaid, the Baron's clerk. The Baron also commissioned the construction of the Ohel Ya'akov Synagogue, named after his father, to serve the town. Sparing no expense to build the edifice, the synagogue features a majestic ark made of white marble. The synagogue opened in 1886 and has conducted daily prayer services continuously to this day.

Following a number of economic failures, in 1885 Rothschild helped to establish the first winery in Israel, Carmel Winery, together with a bottling factory, in Zikhron Ya'akov. This was more successful economically although it was initially short-lived as in 1892 the grapevines succumbed to phylloxera, a type of parasite. After a brief set-back, American seedlings which were resistant to phylloxera were grown and the winery began to flourish. Today, the winery remains in action, as do the huge wine cellars that were carved into the mountain over a century ago.

In 1894, Jewish and Arab workers earned a wage of six piastres working in the plantations, but Jewish workers also received a supplement of four piastres from a charity fund. When Rothschild withdrew his financial support from plantations in Palestine in 1900, the subsidy was discontinued. Jewish workers were quickly replaced by Arab ones, used to being paid the lower wage.

In August 1903, the First Eretz Yisraeli Congress was assembled by Menachem Ussishkin in Zichron Ya'akov. Complementing the World Zionist Congress, it was originally intended as an annual gathering of the leaders of the Yishuv; but it didn't get traction, so the First Congress was also the last one. The effort to coordinate the development of the Yishuv did however bear fruit in establishing the trade union of teachers, which joined Histadrut in 1950 and stays active to this day.

Between 1907 and 1919, Hillel Yaffe's hospital, the only Jewish hospital north of Jaffa, was located in Zichron Ya'akov; according to Hillel Yaffe's wishes, he was buried in Zikhron Ya'akov in 1936.

In 1910 David Ben Gurion worked as a farm labourer in Zichron Ya'akov for several months. At that time he found several Arab families living in the yards of almost every farmer.

In 1954, the remains of Baron Edmond de Rothschild were reinterred in Zikhron Ya'akov.

Nili spy ring
Zikhron Ya'akov came to fame during World War I for the establishment of the Nili spy ring by Sarah Aaronsohn, together with her brothers, Aaron (a noted botanist) and Alex, and their friend Avshalom Feinberg. The group volunteered to spy on Ottoman positions and report them to British agents offshore. In September 1917, the Ottomans caught one of Sarah's carrier pigeons and cracked the Nili code. In October, they surrounded Zikhron Ya'akov and arrested Sarah and several others. After four days of torture, they planned on transporting Sara elsewhere, she requested to be taken home to change her clothes and shot herself with a pistol hidden in her bathroom and died after several days. Sara shot herself in the throat, leaving her unable to speak, in order to avoid releasing classified information. The Aaronsohn House–Nili Museum recreates the history of this period.

Demographics
 

In the 1922 census of Palestine conducted by the British Mandate authorities, Zikhron-Yaakov  had a population of 1,302 inhabitants; 1,013 Jews, 7 Christians and   282 Muslims, where the Christians were 2 Orthodox, 3 Roman Catholics, 1 Anglican and 1 Protestant.

The population increased dramatically in the early 1950s, after the establishment of the State of Israel.  Between the 1960s and 1990s, the population remained constant with about 5,000 inhabitants. At the end of 2009, Zikhron Yaakov had a population of 18,719. Many residents continue to engage in agriculture,  although upscale private homes have been built by families attracted to the scenic landscape. Zikhron Ya'akov has a high number of English speaking residents, olim and others.

Education and religious institutions
While the majority of citizens of the town would define themselves as secular, there is a sizable religious Jewish community in the town, including Haredi members of the Ohr Yaakov Yeshiva and members of a Chabad-Lubavitch community. In addition there are several religious zionist synagogues. It is unique in that there are Progressive/Reform and Conservative Jewish communities and synagogues in Zikhron Ya'akov. The former, "Kehillat Sulam Yaakov" (in Hebrew "Jacob's Ladder Community") is a synagogue that practices Progressive Judaism and is a part of the Israeli Movement for Progressive Judaism. The latter, "VeAhavta", is a synagogue that practices Conservative Judaism.

Landmarks

The original Carmel-Mizrahi Winery continues to make wine in Zikhron Yaakov. The town draws many tourists attracted to its picturesque setting and historic city center whose restored main street of landmark buildings, called Derekh HaYayin ("Path of the Wine"), houses coffeehouses and boutique shops selling locally-made crafts, jewellery, and antiques, especially on the town's famous "Midrachov" (Rechov haMeyasdim — Founders Street). It was announced in early 2008 that a  wine park would be created on the slope between Zikhron and neighboring town Binyamina.

Notable residents

Aaron Aaronsohn
Sarah Aaronsohn
Aaron Ben-Ze'ev
 Rivka Carmi (b. 1948), Israeli pediatrician, geneticist, and President of Ben-Gurion University of the Negev
Tony Cliff
Reuven Gal
Moshe Ivgy
Chaim Dov Kantor
 Peretz Lavie (b. 1949)
Motti Lerner
Avi Mizrahi
Yair Naveh
David Remez
Dan Shilon
Joseph Zaritsky (1891–1985), Israeli painter

Twin towns – sister cities

Zikhron Ya'akov is twinned with:
 Charenton-le-Pont, France
 South Palm Beach, United states

See also
 Israeli wine

References

Bibliography

External links
Official website
Tourist Israel: Zichron Yaakov

 
Jewish villages in the Ottoman Empire
Jewish villages in Mandatory Palestine
Local councils in Haifa District
Romanian-Jewish culture in Israel
Populated places established in 1882
1882 establishments in the Ottoman Empire
Mount Carmel
Edmond James de Rothschild